The San Lorenzo Historic District, in San Lorenzo, Grant County, New Mexico, is an  historic district which was listed on the National Register of Historic Places in 1988.

The district runs roughly along the west side of Galaz St., the main street of San Lorenzo, and some adjacent blocks between C and H Streets.  It includes 29 contributing buildings.

Most buildings are adobe in New Mexico vernacular style.  It includes a school built by the Works Projects Administration.

It was listed on the National Register as part of a 1988 study of historic resources in the Mimbres Valley of Grant County.

References

Historic districts on the National Register of Historic Places in New Mexico
National Register of Historic Places in Grant County, New Mexico